Jaan Sihver (30 April 1879 Vana-Tänassilma Parish, Viljandi County – 28 November 1918 near Narva) was an Estonian politician, communist. He was a member of Estonian Provincial Assembly. On 5 February 1919, he was (posthumously) expelled from the assembly.

References

1879 births
1918 deaths
Members of the Estonian Provincial Assembly
Estonian military personnel killed in action